is a Japanese professional football club based in Osaka. The club currently plays in the J1 League, which is the top tier of football in the country. The club's name Cerezo (Spanish for cherry blossom) is also the flower of the city of Osaka. The official hometowns of the club are Osaka and Sakai. They form a local rivalry with Suita-based Gamba Osaka.

History 
The club, originally called Yanmar Diesel, started in 1957 as the company team of Yanmar and was an original founder ("Original Eight") of the now-disbanded Japan Soccer League (JSL) in 1965. With four Japanese league titles to its credit, it was a mainstay of the JSL Division 1 until 1990 when it was first relegated, and joined the former Japan Football League (JFL) in 1992.

In 1993, the club incorporated as Osaka Football Club Co., Ltd. and adopted the name Cerezo after a public contest. In 1994, they won the JFL championship and was promoted to the J1 League in 1995. This also coincided with a run to the finals of the Emperor's Cup, which they lost to Bellmare Hiratsuka.

Cerezo has relegated from J1 to J2 three times, but are currently playing in the J1 league. The club had an impressive third-place finish in the 2017 season.

On 4 November 2017 they won the J.League YBC Levain Cup, the first major title for Cerezo Osaka.  The final match was against Kawasaki Frontale.

On 1 January 2018, Cerezo Osaka won the Emperor's Cup, securing their second major title. The final match was against Yokohama F. Marinos.

On 10 February 2018, they won the Xerox Super Cup, playing against Kawasaki Frontale.

In May 2018, the club changed its incorporated name from Osaka Football Club Co., Ltd. to Cerezo Osaka Co., Ltd.

In 2022, the club got close to winning the J.League Cup for their second title, but blew a 1-0 lead to Sanfrecce Hiroshima in injury time after player Pieros Sotiriou scored two goals in the 96th and 101st minutes of the match to give the Violas the J.League Cup.

Stadiums 
The hometowns of the club are Osaka and Sakai. The club plays at the Yodoko Sakura Stadium, with some bigger matches played at the Yanmar Stadium Nagai.

The club practices at Minami Tsumori Sakura Sports Park, Maishima Sports Island and Amagasaki Yanmar Diesel Ground.

Mascots 
The club's mascots are a wolf named Lobby (from Spanish lobo, meaning wolf) and Madame Lobina, Lobby's mother. On February 22, 2020, host and TV personality Roland was appointed Cerezo's "Official CereMan".

Rivalries 
Cerezo's biggest rival is fellow Osaka club Gamba Osaka. The matches played between Cerezo and Gamba are referred to as the Osaka derby.

Kits and colours 
Cerezo's club colour is pink, like the cherry blossoms that the club's name is based on. Combination colours have been navy blue and black. This year, the uniform colour is pink (home) and white (away) for the outfield players and black (home), pink (away) and green for the goalkeepers.

During the Yanmar Diesel days in the late 1970s to mid-1980s, the uniform was all-red reminiscent of Deportivo Toluca.

Colours, sponsors and kit makers

Kit evolution

League and cup record 

Key

League history 
Japan Soccer League Division 1: 1965–1990 (as Yanmar Diesel)
Japan Soccer League Division 2: 1991 (as Yanmar Diesel)
Japan Football League Division 1: 1992–94 (as Yanmar Diesel until 1993; Cerezo Osaka since 1994)
J1 League: 1995–2001
J2 League: 2002
J1 League: 2003–2006
J2 League: 2007–2009
J1 League: 2010–2014
J2 League: 2015–2016
J1 League: 2017–present

Current squad

Out on loan

Reserve squad (U-18s)

Honours 
As both Yanmar Diesel (1957–1993) and Cerezo Osaka (1993–present)LeagueJapan Soccer LeagueWinners (4): 1971, 1974, 1975, 1980Japan Football LeagueWinners (1): 1994 (as the company team)
CupsJSL Cup/J.League CupWinners (4): 1973 (shared), 1983, 1984, 2017Emperor's CupWinners (4): 1968, 1970, 1974,  2017Japanese Super CupWinners (1): 2018Queen's CupWinners (1)': 1976

 Continental record 

 Club officials For the 2023 season.''

Manager history

In popular culture 
In the popular Captain Tsubasa manga, a character named Teppei Kisugi becomes a professional football player and joins Cerezo Osaka.

Former players

Notes

References

External links 
 Cerezo Osaka official website 
 Cerezo Osaka official website 

 
J.League clubs
Japan Soccer League clubs
Football clubs in Osaka
Association football clubs established in 1957
Emperor's Cup winners
Japanese League Cup winners
1957 establishments in Japan
Japan Football League (1992–1998) clubs